Polladhavan may refer to:

Polladhavan (1980  film), Tamil film directed by V. Srinivasan
Polladhavan (2007 film), Tamil film directed by Vetrimaran